The American Academy of Acupuncture and Oriental Medicine (AAAOM) was established in 1997 in response to the encouragement of staff and faculty at the Shandong University of Traditional Chinese Medicine in Jinan, China. Classes began in 1999 in a small collection of rooms in the University Technology Center building in Dinkytown, near the University of Minnesota, United States. At that time there were about 40 full and part-time students and the school consisted of two class rooms, four treatment rooms and a small series of adjoining offices which served as reception, administration office and pharmacy. The one clinic consultation room was little more than a closet with a window and enough space for a desk and two chairs.

Today the American Academy of Acupuncture and Oriental Medicine occupies its own campus with a traditional herbal pharmacy, five classrooms, 12 treatment rooms, student clinic, student lounge, a study room with internet access, a large practice space for events and t'ai chi ch'uan classes as well as a library of Traditional Chinese Medecine (TCM) literature in Chinese and English in the United States.

AAAOM is the only independent accredited school of TCM in Minnesota. In 2000, TCM World magazine awarded AAAOM “Best Faculty.”  In 2002, Twin Cities Wellness magazine called AAAOM the “Mayo Clinic of Eastern Medicine.”  In 2003, TCM World Magazine recognized AAAOM as being the “Best New School” and recognized as having the “Best Curriculum” for TCM in the country.

AAAOM offers a Master of Science degree in acupuncture and Oriental medicine – emphasizing the diagnostic and pathology model of TCM and all aspects of traditional treatment methods; not just acupuncture, but also extensive study of Chinese herbal medicine, dietary therapy, Chinese tuina massage and healing Qigong.  AAAOM is one of the minority of schools in the country that offers a replica of the training received if the student was to study TCM in China.  Students may elect to specialize in traditional Chinese internal medicine, gynecology, geriatrics, pediatrics, dermatology, neurological disorders, musculo-skeletal disorders or sensory organ disorders.
A feature of the AAAOM program is its affiliation with medical schools in China.

The Shandong University of Traditional Chinese Medicine in Jinan, China (AAAOM sister school) has served not only as a model for the formation of AAAOM, but has also hosted two graduates for PhD study in TCM.  Exchange programs for advanced study in TCM can also be arranged at other medical universities in China.

Faculty
AAAOM's faculty include eight Chinese scholar–physicians from who have made contributions to the field of Traditional Chinese Medicine (TCM).  Collectively they have published over 600 articles, textbooks, research papers and reference books in China and the United States. Biomedicine classes are taught by Western doctors and chiropractors trained in the United States.

Student body
The majority of students are women over the age of 30 and over 14% of the student population is of a non-Caucasian ethnicity.  Due to the small size of the school, the 110 students enjoy small classes and close relations with faculty and administrative staff.

Location
The American Academy of Acupuncture and Oriental Medicine (AAAOM) is located at 1925 West County Road B2 in Roseville, Minnesota, near the junction of Interstate 35W and Highway 36.

Accreditation
The Master of Science in Acupuncture and Oriental Medicine program of the AAAOM is accredited by the Accreditation Commission for Acupuncture and Oriental Medicine (ACAOM), which is the recognized accrediting agency for the approval of programs preparing acupuncture and Oriental medicine practitioners.

Minnesota license requirements for practice
Minnesota requires passage of the National Certification Commission for Acupuncture and Oriental Medicine (NCCAOM) acupuncture examination in order to practice in the state. Minnesota Board of Medical Practice is licensing agency for practicing acupuncture in Minnesota. Graduates from the Acupuncture and Oriental Medicine program at the American Academy of Acupuncture and Oriental Medicine, which is an accredited program with the Accreditation Commission for Acupuncture and Oriental Medicine (ACAOM), are qualified to take the NCCAOM exams. AAAOM prepares its students for national certification by the National Commission for the Certification of Acupuncture and Oriental Medicine (NCCAOM).

References

External links
 

Acupuncture organizations
Roseville, Minnesota
Medical and health organizations based in Minnesota
1997 establishments in Minnesota
Organizations established in 1997